Saint-Pierre-Brouck (from Dutch Sint-Pietersbroek, meaning "Saint-Peter marsh") ) is a commune in the Nord department in northern France.

Heraldry

See also
Communes of the Nord department

References

Saintpierrebrouck
French Flanders